is a city in Chiba Prefecture, Japan. , the city had an estimated population of  498,575 in 242,981 households and a population density of 8100 persons per km².

Geography
Matsudo is located in the far northwestern corner of Chiba Prefecture, about 20 to 30 kilometers from the prefectural capital at Chiba and 10 to 20 kilometers from downtown Tokyo. The western border of the city is the Edo River, which flows from north to south, and most of the city is on an alluvial plain with an elevation of only around four meters above sea level, with the eastern end rising to 20 to 30 meters on the Shimōsa Plateau. The city has the approximate dimensions of 11.4 kilometers from east-to-west and 11.6 kilometers from north-to-south.

Neighboring municipalities
Chiba Prefecture
Ichikawa
Kashiwa
Nagareyama
Kamagaya
Saitama Prefecture
Misato
Tokyo
Edogawa
Katsushika

Climate
Matsudo has a humid subtropical climate (Köppen Cfa) characterized by warm summers and cool winters with light to no snowfall.  The average annual temperature in Matsudo is 15.0 °C. The average annual rainfall is 1399 mm with September as the wettest month. The temperatures are highest on average in August, at around 26.8 °C, and lowest in January, at around 4.5 °C.

Demographics
Per Japanese census data, the population of Matsudo increased very rapidly in the 1960s and 1970s and has continued to grow at a slower pace since.

History

The area around Matsudo has been inhabited since prehistoric times, and archaeologists have found remains from the Jōmon period, as well as burial tumuli from the Kofun period. During the Edo period, the area was tenryō controlled directly by the Tokugawa shogunate, and contained a number of horse ranches providing war horses for the Shōgun's armies. It also developed as a post station on the Mito Kaidō connecting Edo with Mito, and supplied vegetables and the produce to Edo via its waterways. Matsudo Shrine has a close connection with Tokugawa Mitsukuni and the Matsudo Tojo was the residence of Tokugawa Akitake, the last daimyō of Mito Domain after the Meiji restoration.

Matsudo Town was created in Higashikatsushika District Chiba Prefecture with the establishment of the modern municipalities system on April 1, 1889. Matsudo attained city status on October 1, 1943.

However, many politicians in Kogane Town were vehemently opposed to the merger, and forced its dissolution on October 15, 1954 with most of former Kogane Town merging with Matsudo instead. Beginning in the 1960s, the rapid economic growth in Japan (and the Tokyo area in particular) led to a construction boom in Matsudo and the development of the area as a major suburb of Tokyo. Matsudo is now the fourth-largest city in Chiba Prefecture and a major bedroom community  in the Greater Tokyo Area.

Government
Matsudo has a mayor-council form of government with a directly elected mayor and a unicameral city council of 44 members. Matsudo contributes seven members to the Chiba Prefectural Assembly. In terms of national politics, the city is divided between the Chiba 6th district and the Chiba 7th district of the lower house of the Diet of Japan.

Economy

Matsudo is a regional commercial center and a bedroom community for nearby Chiba and Tokyo, with some 37% of the population commuting to Tokyo. Although located in Chiba Prefecture, the city has relatively poor transportation connections to Chiba City. The city has a mixed industrial base. The small electric motor manufacturer, Mabuchi Motor is headquartered in Matsudo.

Education

Universities
 Chiba University, Matsudo Campus
 Nihon University, Matsudo Dental Campus
 Seitoku University
 Ryutsu Keizai University, Matsudo Campus
 Seitoku University Junior College

Primary and secondary education
Matsudo has 45 public elementary schools and 20 public middle schools operated by the city government,, and eight public high schools operated by the Chiba Prefectural Board of Education. The prefecture also operates three special education schools for the handicapped. The city also has one private elementary school, two private middle schools and two private high schools.

Sport
 Velodrome: Matsudo Velodrome

Transportation

Railway
 JR East – Jōban Line
 -  -  -  - 
 JR East –  Musashino Line
 -  - 
Shin-Keisei Electric Railway  -  Shin-Keisei Line
 -  -  -　 -  -  -  - 
 Hokusō Railway - Hokuso Line
 -  -  - 
 Keisei Electric Railway - Keisei Narita Airport Line

 Tobu Railway  – Tobu Urban Park Line

 Ryūtetsu – Nagareyama Line
 -  -  -

Highway

Local attractions

Manman-ji – Buddhist temple
 Showa no Mori Museum

Sister city relations
 – Box Hill, Victoria, Australia, since May 12, 1971. When Box Hill amalgamated with Nunawading in December 1994, the relationship was re-affirmed with the new City of Whitehorse. A small, multi-story department store attached to Matsudo train station bears the name "Box Hill".
 – Kurayoshi, Tottori, Japan

Notable people from Matsudo

Sadao Abe, actor, musician
Sayaka Akimoto, singer, actress, former AKB48 member
Shūichi Higurashi, manga illustrator
Hiroshi Kamiya, voice actor
Akiyuki Kido, figure skater
Yasunori Matsumoto, voice actor
Haruko Obokata, stem-cell biologist
Matsunobori Shigeo, sumo wrestler
Yuji Unozawa, professional soccer player
Yutaka Wada, professional baseball player
Hideaki Wakui, professional baseball player
Naoko Yamazaki, astronaut
Tsutomu Yamazaki, actor
Hiromichi Watanabe, Politician (Minister for Reconstruction)

References

External links

Official Website 

 
Cities in Chiba Prefecture
Populated places established in 1943
1943 establishments in Japan